Bet You're from a Small Town is the debut studio album by American country music singer Jameson Rodgers. It was released on September 17, 2021 via Columbia Nashville. The album contains the number-one singles "Some Girls" and "Cold Beer Calling My Name", the latter of which features Luke Combs.

Track listing

Content
Co-writing 14 of the album's 15 tracks, the newlywed singer explores themes of love, loss, small towns, and drinking beer, but manages to cover each of those tropes in a way that is new and unique.

Charts

References

2021 debut albums
Jameson Rodgers albums
Columbia Records albums
Albums produced by Chris Farren (country musician)